In mathematics, the mediant of two fractions, generally made up of four positive integers

That is to say, the numerator and denominator of the mediant are the sums of the numerators and denominators of the given fractions, respectively. It is sometimes called the freshman sum, as it is a common mistake in the early stages of learning about addition of fractions.

Technically, this is a binary operation on valid fractions (nonzero denominator), considered as ordered pairs of appropriate integers, a priori disregarding the perspective on rational numbers as equivalence classes of fractions. For example, the mediant of the fractions 1/1 and 1/2 is 2/3. However, if the fraction 1/1 is replaced by the fraction 2/2, which is an equivalent fraction denoting the same rational number 1, the mediant of the fractions 2/2 and 1/2 is 3/4. For a stronger connection to rational numbers the fractions may be required to be reduced to lowest terms, thereby selecting unique representatives from the respective equivalence classes.

The Stern–Brocot tree provides an enumeration of all positive rational numbers via mediants in lowest terms, obtained purely by iterative computation of the mediant according to a simple algorithm.

Properties

 Componendo:

 Dividendo:

 Assume that the pair of fractions a/c and b/d satisfies the determinant relation . Then the mediant has the property that it is the simplest fraction in the interval (a/c, b/d), in the sense of being the fraction with the smallest denominator. To see why the  must be positive note that  and  must be positive. Therefore, 
 The converse is also true: assume that the pair of reduced fractions a/c < b/d has the property that the reduced fraction with smallest denominator lying in the interval (a/c, b/d) is equal to the mediant of the two fractions. Then the determinant relation  holds. This fact may be deduced e.g. with the help of Pick's theorem which expresses the area of a plane triangle whose vertices have integer coordinates in terms of the number vinterior of lattice points (strictly) inside the triangle and the number vboundary of lattice points on the boundary of the triangle. Consider the triangle  with the three vertices v1 = (0, 0), v2 = (a, c), v3 = (b, d). Its area is equal to  A point  inside the triangle can be parametrized as  where  The Pick formula  now implies that there must be a lattice point  lying inside the triangle different from the three vertices if  (then the area of the triangle is ). The corresponding fraction q1/q2 lies (strictly) between the given (by assumption reduced) fractions and has denominator  as 
 Relatedly, if p/q and r/s are reduced fractions on the unit interval such that |ps − rq| = 1 (so that they are adjacent elements of a row of the Farey sequence) then   where  is Minkowski's question mark function. In fact, mediants commonly occur in the study of continued fractions and in particular, Farey fractions. The nth Farey sequence Fn is defined as the (ordered with respect to magnitude) sequence of reduced fractions a/b (with coprime a, b) such that b ≤ n. If two fractions a/c < b/d are adjacent (neighbouring) fractions in a segment of Fn then the determinant relation  mentioned above is generally valid and therefore the mediant is the simplest fraction in the interval (a/c, b/d), in the sense of being the fraction with the smallest denominator. Thus the mediant will then (first) appear in the (c + d)th Farey sequence and is the "next" fraction which is inserted in any Farey sequence between a/c and b/d. This gives the rule how the Farey sequences Fn are successively built up with increasing n.

Graphical determination of mediants

A positive rational number is one in the form  where  are positive natural numbers; i.e. . Since  are not required to be coprime, point  represents one and only one rational number, but a rational number is represented by more than one point; e.g.  are all representations of the rational number . This is a slight modification of the formal definition of rational numbers, restricting them to positive values, and flipping the order of the terms in the ordered pair  so that the slope of the segment becomes equal to the rational number.

In this case, one segment coincides with the other, since their slopes are equal. The area of the parallelogram formed by two consecutive rational numbers in the Stern–Brocot tree is always 1.

Generalization

The notion of mediant can be generalized to n fractions, and a generalized mediant inequality holds, a fact that seems to have been first noticed by Cauchy.

See also
 Mediant
 Farey sequence
 Stern–Brocot tree

References

External links
 Mediant Fractions at cut-the-knot
  MATHPAGES, Kevin Brown: Generalized Mediant

Fractions (mathematics)
Elementary arithmetic
Operations on numbers